Agbaja is the locality of a large iron ore deposit in Kogi State, central Nigeria.

People 
Agbaja is inhabited by the Oworo people who speak a dialect of Yoruba also called Oworo. Agbaja was the administrative capital of Oworo district during the colonial era and still remains the traditional and political capital of the Oworo people.

Locale 

It is located on a plateau about 300 km south of the capital Abuja, and more importantly about 70 km from the heavy duty railway to the sea at Itakpe which is about 70 km to the south.

Resource 

The Licences contain magnetite to the extent of 2.0-3.3 billion tonnes of potential iron mineralisation grading in the range of 48% to 53% Fe.

Timeline

2011 

 Progress

See also 

 Railway stations in Nigeria

References 

Mining in Nigeria